Ashley River is an unincorporated community in Charleston County, South Carolina. Its zip code is 29407.

References

External links
 U.S. Geological Survey. Best Practices National Structures Dataset. https://web.archive.org/web/20090825115836/http://bpgeo.cr.usgs.gov/. 30 July 2008.
 Ashley River, South Carolina. Geographic Names Information System, U.S. Geological Survey.

Populated places in Charleston County, South Carolina